Asio is a freely available, open-source, cross-platform C++ library for network programming.  It provides developers with a consistent asynchronous I/O model using a modern C++ approach.
Boost.Asio was accepted into the Boost library on 30 December 2005 after a 20-day review.  The library has been developed by Christopher M. Kohlhoff since 2003. A networking proposal based on Asio was submitted to the C++ standards committee in 2006 for possible inclusion in the second Technical Report on C++ Library Extensions (TR2).

Notes

External links 
Asio home page
Boost Asio documentation
Samples

C++ libraries
Software using the Boost license